Jayamohan Thampi (10 April 1956 – 6 June 2020) was an Indian cricketer who played in six first-class matches for Kerala between 1979 and 1982. He died from a head injury, with his son later arrested and charged with his murder.

References

External links
 

1956 births
2020 deaths
Indian cricketers
Kerala cricketers
Place of birth missing
South Zone cricketers
Cricketers from Kochi